The 2010–11 Heineken Cup pool stage was the first stage of the current season of the Heineken Cup, Europe's top competition for rugby union clubs. It involved 24 teams competing for eight quarter-final berths; the quarter-finalists will then participate in a knockout tournament that will ultimately end with the final on 21 May 2011 at Millennium Stadium in Cardiff.

The draw for the pool stage took place on 8 June 2010 in Cardiff. The competing teams were arranged into six pools consisting of four teams each, with the six pool winners and two best runners-up qualifying for the knockout stages. The third- through fifth-best runners-up parachuted into the knockout stage of the Amlin Challenge Cup.

The pool stage began with three matches on 8 October 2010 and ended with four matches on 23 January 2011.

Seeding
The seeding system was the same as in the 2009–10 tournament. The 24 competing teams are ranked based on past Heineken Cup and European Challenge Cup performance, with each pool receiving one team from each quartile, or Tier. The requirement to have only one team per country in each pool, however, still applies (with the exception of the inclusion of the seventh French team).

The brackets show each team's European Rugby Club Ranking at the end of the 2009–10 season. Aironi inherited the ranking of Viadana, the principal shareholders in the new Magners League team.

Tiebreakers
The competition organiser, European Rugby Cup, has elaborate tiebreaking rules for both the Heineken Cup and Amlin Challenge Cup, with a total of seven possible steps.

The first three apply only if tied teams are in the same pool:
 Competition points earned in head-to-head matches
 Total tries scored in head-to-head matches
 Point differential in head-to-head matches

The remaining steps are used if tied teams are in different pools, or if the above steps cannot break a tie between teams in the same pool:
 Tries scored in all pool matches
 Point differential in all pool matches
 Best disciplinary record (fewest players receiving red or yellow cards in all pool matches)
 Coin toss

Results

All kickoff times are local to the match location.

Pool 1

	

	
		

 This match was postponed from the original date of 19 December due to heavy snow in Edinburgh. The rescheduled match was held behind closed doors due to snow-related access issues in the stadium area.

Pool 2

Pool 3

Pool 4

Biarritz won the tiebreaker over Ulster with a 6–4 advantage in head-to-head competition points.

Pool 5

Notes
 Perpignan won the tiebreaker over Leicester Tigers with a 6–3 edge in head-to-head competition points.

Pool 6

 This match was postponed twice from its originally scheduled kickoff of 18 December. Weather-related travel delays prevented Glasgow from arriving in Toulouse until hours before the planned kickoff, causing a postponement to 19 December. The team's equipment, which was travelling on a separate flight, was further delayed, leading to the second postponement.

Seeding and runners-up
 Bare numbers indicate Heineken Cup quarter-final seeding.
 Numbers with "C" indicate Challenge Cup quarter-final seeding.

See also
 2010-11 Heineken Cup

References

External links
Official ERC website

Pool Stage
Heineken Cup pool stages